M4Tel (formerly: MFOURTEL MÉXICO, SA DE CV) is a Mexican smartphone company founded in 2012 in Mexico City, which produces its Smartphones and Modems in China, which has a presence in 8 Latin American countries.

History 

In April 2012, the idea that had been coming for a year materialized and was founded as such: M4Tel. At first, only low and medium phones were manufactured, looking for anyone to be able to buy a phone with medium capabilities at regular prices. However, for its founders, rapid growth was not so important, but rather to consolidate itself as a trusted company and thanks to the alliance it has with Qualcomm, the quality of the products is guaranteed. In 2017 they entered the electronics market with the M4 MiFi Freedom, a portable modem of versatile size capable of connecting up to 10 users simultaneously.

It currently has a presence in more than 8 Latin American countries.

See also 

 Lanix
 Zonda Telecom

References 

Mobile phone manufacturers
Electronics companies established in 2012
Consumer electronics brands
Mexico City
Mexican brands
Mexican companies established in 2012